Otis Junction is an unincorporated community in Lincoln County, Oregon, United States, at the junction of the former route of U.S. Route 101 and Oregon Route 18, a half mile south of Otis. It is a mile and a half east of where OR 18 intersects with the modern route of U.S. 101.

Otis Junction is the site of the James Beard Award-winning Otis Café. There has been a café at this location since the 1920s. Pixieland, a former amusement park, was located a mile west of Otis Junction, near U.S. 101.

Sale of Otis

References

Unincorporated communities in Lincoln County, Oregon
Unincorporated communities in Oregon